Tony Stewart is an American semi-retired professional race car driver who won three Drivers' Championships in the NASCAR Cup Series. He made his NASCAR debut in the Busch Series with the Ranier-Walsh Racing team in 1996 before moving to the Labonte Motorsports squad for part of the 1997 season. Following this, Stewart moved to the Joe Gibbs Racing (JGR) team for the remainder of the season and 1998. Stewart moved to the higher-tier Cup Series with JGR in 1999, winning that season's Rookie of the Year for finishing fourth in the Drivers' Championship with three race victories. He won six races in the 2000 season, more than any other driver that year. This was followed by another three race wins each in 2001 and his first championship winning season in 2002 with three more race victories. Stewart won twice each in the 2003 and 2004 seasons, and took his second drivers' championship with five victories in 2005.

The following year, he won five more races despite not qualifying for the season-ending Chase for the Nextel Cup. Stewart's final victory for JGR came at the 2008 AMP Energy 500 at Talladega Superspeedway. He joined Stewart-Haas Racing (SHR) as a driver-owner in 2009. Stewart finished sixth in the final points standings with four victories, but fell to seventh with two wins in 2010. In the 2011 season, he won five races in the Chase for the Sprint Cup to win his third drivers' championship on a tiebreak with Roush Fenway Racing driver Carl Edwards, who won once. The achievement made Stewart the first Cup Series driver-owner champion since Alan Kulwicki in 1992. This was followed by three victories in 2012 and one in 2013. The 2014 and 2015 seasons were the only two in the Cup Series in which Stewart did not register a race victory. His final win in NASCAR came at the 16th round of the 2016 season in the Toyota/Save Mart 350 at Sonoma Raceway.

In all, Stewart won a total of 62 NASCAR races, 49 of which were in the Cup Series. Stewart also won 11 races in the Busch Series (later Nationwide Series) and 2 in the Craftsman Truck Series. The majority of his race victories were for JGR with 38; he also won 16 races with SHR, 4 for Kevin Harvick Incorporated (KHI), 2 for Andy Petree Racing and 1 each for Hendrick Motorsports and Richard Childress Racing. , Stewart ranks 15th on the all-time in the Cup Series wins list with 49, and 15th overall in all 3 of NASCAR's national series with 62. His most successful circuit was Daytona International Speedway, where he won 11 times. Stewart's largest margin of victory was at the 2006 Banquet 400 at Kansas Speedway, a race where he finished 12.422 ahead of the second-placed Casey Mears of Chip Ganassi Racing, and the smallest margin of victory was at the 2011 DRIVE4COPD 300 at Daytona, where he beat his KHI teammate Clint Bowyer by 0.007 seconds.

NASCAR

Cup Series
In the NASCAR Cup Series, which was sponsored by Winston, Nextel, and Sprint during Stewart's career, Stewart, the 1999 Rookie of the Year and three-time Cup Series champion, won 49 races. Throughout his career, he won at 21 out of 24 tracks at which he raced on, leaving Darlington Raceway, Kentucky Speedway, and Rockingham Speedway the three circuits where he failed to win. As of the end of the 2019 Monster Energy NASCAR Cup Series, Stewart's 49 wins rank 15th of all time.

Key:
 No. – Victory number; for example, "1" signifies Stewart's first race win.
 Race – Race number in Stewart's NASCAR Cup/Nationwide/Truck Series career; for example "92" signifies Stewart's 92nd race in a NASCAR division.
 Grid – The position on the grid from which Stewart started the race.
 Margin – Margin of victory, given in the format of seconds.milliseconds; caution indicates the race was ended by a yellow flag for an accident or inclement weather
  – Driver's Championship winning season.

Nationwide Series

In NASCAR's second-level series, variously known as the Busch Series, and Nationwide Series during Stewart's racing career and now known as the Xfinity Series. Stewart won 11 races. Two of those victories were during the period in which Anheuser-Busch's Busch beer brand was series sponsor, and the remaining nine were under the sponsorship of the Nationwide Mutual Insurance Company.

Craftsman Truck Series
In NASCAR's third-level series, known as the Craftsman Truck Series during Stewart's racing career and now the Gander RV & Outdoors Truck Series, Stewart won two races. Both victories came were during the period when Stanley Black & Decker's Craftsman brand was series sponsor.

Victories at different tracks
The  symbol indicates Stewart won at a track twice in a calendar year.

See also
 List of all-time NASCAR Cup Series winners

Notes

References

Wins
Career achievements of racing drivers
NASCAR-related lists